Yevgeni Viktorovich Balyaikin (born 19 May 1988) is a Russian footballer who plays as central midfielder.

Club career

Career statistics

Notes

International career
Balyaikin was a part of the Russia U-21 side that was competing in the 2011 European Under-21 Championship qualification.

References

External links
 Player page on the official FC Rubin Kazan website 
 

1988 births
People from Bratsk
Living people
Russian footballers
Russia under-21 international footballers
Russia national football B team footballers
Association football midfielders
FC Rubin Kazan players
FC Tom Tomsk players
PFC Krylia Sovetov Samara players
FC SKA-Khabarovsk players
FC Ararat Yerevan players
FC Metalurgi Rustavi players
Russian Premier League players
Russian First League players
Armenian Premier League players
Russian expatriate footballers
Expatriate footballers in Armenia
Expatriate footballers in Georgia (country)
Russian expatriate sportspeople in Armenia
Russian expatriate sportspeople in Georgia (country)
Sportspeople from Irkutsk Oblast